The women's 800 metres at the 2005 World Championships in Athletics was held on August 6, 7 and 9 at the Helsinki Olympic Stadium.

Medals

Results
All times shown are in seconds.

Heats
August 6, 2005

Heat 1
 Hazel Clark 2:01.91 Q
 Kenia Sinclair 2:02.18 Q
 Mina Aït Hammou 2:02.36 Q
 Agnes Samaria 2:02.46 Q
 Neisha Bernard-Thomas 2:02.50
 Brigita Langerholc 2:03.06
 Binnaz Uslu 2:03.73
 Marlyse Nsourou 2:14.47 (SB)

Heat 2
 Zulia Calatayud 2:00.77 Q
 Hasna Benhassi 2:00.77 Q
 Kameisha Bennett 2:01.78 Q
 Susan Scott 2:02.00 Q
 Teodora Kolarova 2:02.45
 Miho Sato 2:02.82
 Marcela Britos 2:10.21
 Markabo Djama Liban 2:50.95

Heat 3
 Tatyana Andrianova 2:06.38 Q
 Alice Schmidt 2:07.10 Q
 Mayte Martínez 2:07.34 Q
 Ewelina Sętowska-Dryk 2:07.37 Q
 Myint Myint Aye 2:08.50
 Marian Burnett 2:09.88
 Nahida Touhami DNS

Heat 4
 Svetlana Cherkasova 2:00.62 Q
 Laetitia Valdonado 2:00.87 Q
 Sviatlana Usovich 2:01.09 Q
 Lucia Klocová 2:01.63 Q (SB)
 Tetiana Petlyuk 2:01.78 q (SB)
 Seltana Aït Hammou 2:02.16
 Elisa Cusma Piccione 2:05.95
 Gulnaz Ara 2:13.87 (SB)

Heat 5
 Larisa Chzhao 2:00.64 Q
 Maria Mutola 2:00.71 Q
 Michelle Ballentine 2:01.05 Q (SB)
 Mihaela Neacsu 2:01.35 Q
 Monika Gradzki 2:01.56 q
 Letitia Vriesde 2:01.65 q (SB)
 Diane Cummins 2:01.71 q
 Akosua Serwaa DNS

Semifinals
August 7, 2005

Heat 1
 Hazel Clark 1:59.00 Q
 Larisa Chzhao 1:59.07 Q
 Maria Mutola 1:59.29 q
 Mayte Martínez 1:59.40 q (SB)
 Mina Aït Hammou 2:00.22
 Mihaela Neacsu 2:00.63
 Lucia Klocová 2:00.64 (SB)
 Susan Scott 2:01.17 (SB)

Heat 2
 Zulia Calatayud 1:57.92 Q (SB)
 Svetlana Cherkasova 1:58.58 Q
 Kenia Sinclair 1:59.45
 Diane Cummins 2:00.10 (SB)
 Agnes Samaria 2:00.13
 Alice Schmidt 2:01.43
 Letitia Vriesde 2:02.07
 Monika Gradzki 2:02.09

Heat 3
 Tatyana Andrianova 2:01.35 Q
 Hasna Benhassi 2:01.59 Q
 Laetitia Valdonado 2:01.90
 Ewelina Sętowska-Dryk 2:02.02
 Sviatlana Usovich 2:02.34
 Tetiana Petlyuk 2:02.46
 Michelle Ballentine 2:03.98
 Kameisha Bennett DNF

Final
August 9, 2005

 Zulia Calatayud 1:58.82
 Hasna Benhassi 1:59.42
 Tatyana Andrianova 1:59.60
 Maria Mutola 1:59.71
 Mayte Martínez 1:59.99
 Larisa Chzhao 2:00.25
 Svetlana Cherkasova 2:00.71
 Hazel Clark 2:01.52

External links
Official results - IAAF.org

800 metres
800 metres at the World Athletics Championships
2005 in women's athletics